Ihor Dybchenko (15 July 1960 – 11 April 2022) was a Ukrainian professional football player and coach who played as a midfielder.

Career
Born in Donetsk, Dybchenko was a product of the local Shakhtar Donetsk youth sportive school system. On 23 July 1981, he made a professional debut for his club in the match against Dnipro Dniproperovsk. 

His football career also included other Ukrainian clubs, mainly from Donbas region.

After retirement from playing career, Dybchenko was appointed president of Shakhtar's women's team (1994–1996). He also worked as a coach (1996–2000) and coached Shakhtar-2 and Shakhtar-3. For more than ten years he headed the selection service at the main club of Shakhtar Donetsk.

Honours
Shakhtar Donetsk
 Soviet Football Cup 1983; runner-up 1984–85, 1985–86

References

External links
 
 Profile at footballfacts.ru (in Russian)

1960 births
2022 deaths
Footballers from Donetsk
Ukrainian footballers
Soviet footballers
Association football midfielders
Soviet Top League players
Ukrainian Second League players
FC Shakhtar Donetsk players
SC Tavriya Simferopol players
FC Shakhtar Horlivka players
FC Kryvbas Kryvyi Rih players
FC Khartsyzk players
FC Pivdenstal Yenakiyeve players
Ukrainian football managers
FC Shakhtar-3 Donetsk managers
FC Shakhtar Donetsk non-playing staff